The following is a list of football stadiums in Argentina, ordered by capacity. Stadiums with a capacity of 10,000 or more are included. Below the list is a list with stadiums with a capacity below 10,000. The minimum capacity is 5,000.

List

Stadiums with a capacity below 10,000

A minimum capacity of at least 5,000 is required.

See also
List of association football stadiums by capacity
List of South American stadiums by capacity

References
World Stadiums – Stadiums in Argentina. Retrieved 2010-10-28

 
Argentina
Football stadiums
Stadiums